Arb Manaj (born 23 July 1998) is a Kosovan professional footballer who plays as a centre-forward for Croatian club Slaven Belupo.

Club career

Dukagjini
Manaj at the age of 6 started playing football in Dukagjini. He before the start of the 2015–16 season was promoted to first team of First Football League of Kosovo club Dukagjini and suffered an ACL injury, two minutes after the start of the match against Ferizaj in third matchday of 2015–16 First Football League of Kosovo. After ten months, Manaj returned from injury, and in the next ten games he scored five goals and assisted three times.

Trepça '89
On 22 July 2017, Manaj joined with Football Superleague of Kosovo club Trepça '89.

Ankara Keçiörengücü
On 5 October 2020, Manaj signed a three-year contract with TFF First League club Ankara Keçiörengücü. Twelve days later, he made his debut in a 1–2 away win against Ümraniyespor after being named in the starting line-up. On 4 November 2020, Manaj scored his first goals for Ankara Keçiörengücü in his third appearance for the club in a 6–0 home win over Büyükçekmece Tepecikspor in 2020–21 Turkish Cup third round.

Loan at Balıkesirspor
On 1 February 2021, Manaj was loaned to TFF First League side Balıkesirspor until the end of the season. Six days later, he made his debut in a 3–0 home win against Akhisarspor after being named in the starting line-up. Seven days after debut, Manaj scored his first goal for Balıkesirspor in his second appearance for the club in a 1–1 away draw over Menemenspor in TFF First League.

Loan at Bandırmaspor
On 9 August 2021, Manaj joined TFF First League side Bandırmaspor, on a season-long loan. Five days later, he made his debut in a 0–2 away win against Denizlispor after coming on as a substitute at 81st minute in place of Guy-Michel Landel.

Slaven Belupo
On 26 July 2022, Manaj signed a two-year contract with Croatian Football League club Slaven Belupo. His debut with Slaven Belupo came on 14 August in a 0–1 away win against Rijeka after coming on as a substitute at 60th minute in place of Marko Žuljević.

International career

Youth

Albania U19
On 30 December 2014, Manaj received a call-up from Albania U19 for the unofficial friendly match against Italy U18, but he was an unused substitute in that match.

Kosovo U21
On 11 November 2019, Manaj received a call-up from Kosovo U21 for the 2021 UEFA European Under-21 Championship qualification match against Austria U21. On 4 September 2020, he made his debut with Kosovo U21 in a 2021 UEFA European Under-21 Championship qualification match against England U21 after being named in the starting line-up.

Senior
On 24 December 2019, Manaj received a call-up from Kosovo for the friendly match against Sweden, and made his debut after coming on as a substitute at 84th minute in place of Elbasan Rashani. On 8 June 2021, Manaj scored his first goal for Kosovo in his second appearance for the country in a 1–2 home defeat over Guinea.

Career statistics

Club

International

|+ List of international goals scored by Arb ManajScores and results list Kosovo's goal tally first, score column indicates score after each Manaj goal.
|-
|1.
|8 June 2021
|Arslan Zeki Demirci Sports Complex, Manavgat, Turkey
|
|align="center"|1–2
|align="center"|1–2
|Friendly
|
|}

References

External links

1998 births
Living people
People from Klina
Sportspeople from Peja
Association football forwards
Kosovan footballers
Kosovo under-21 international footballers
Kosovo international footballers
Kosovan expatriate footballers
Kosovan expatriate sportspeople in Turkey
Kosovan expatriate sportspeople in Croatia
Albanian footballers
Albania youth international footballers
Albanian expatriate footballers
Albanian expatriate sportspeople in Turkey
Albanian expatriate sportspeople in Croatia
Football Superleague of Kosovo players
KF Trepça'89 players
TFF First League players
Ankara Keçiörengücü S.K. footballers
Balıkesirspor footballers
Bandırmaspor footballers
Ümraniyespor footballers
Croatian Football League players
NK Slaven Belupo players